This is a list of media in the Lehigh Valley region of eastern Pennsylvania:

Magazines and newspapers

Television stations

The Lehigh Valley is also part of the Philadelphia television market. Philadelphia stations are available over-the-air and on cable.

* A WFMZ-TV went on the air in December 1954 on analog UHF channel 67.  It went dark in April 1955.

AM radio stations

* As WKAP
** As WCBA (1070)

FM radio stations

* As WXLV (1983 - 2013)
** As WFMZ
*** As WRNJ-FM (1992–1998)

Internet

References

External links

Lehigh Valley
Lehigh Valley
Mass media in Allentown, Pennsylvania
 
Pennsylvania-related lists